Annika Ernst (born 14 March 1982, in Schleswig) is a German actress.

Life and career
Ernst grew up in Georgsdorf in the County of Bentheim district. During her school days at Neuenhaus High School, she began to play in theatre. From 2001 to 2004, she studied acting at the Charlottenburg Acting School in Berlin. During that time, she also attended a three-month method acting workshop at the Actors Studio in New York City.

In 2009 she took part in Til Schweiger's talent show Mission Hollywood. She then worked in various cinema and television productions, including in Schweiger's film Rabbit Without Ears 2. From November 2013 to 2016, she played the leading female role in the ZDF series Herzensbrecher – Vater von vier Söhnen. Between 2015 and 2019, Ernst played the lead role as Commissioner Elena Lange along with Tom Beck in the Sat.1 series Einstein. She also played the senior public prosecutor Kirsten Grambach-Wachta alongside Bert Tischendorf in the RTL series Beck is back! from 2018 to 2019.

Since 2021 she has appeared alongside Hans Sigl and Mark Keller in the ZDF series Der Bergdoktor as the surgeon Dr. Johanna Rüdiger as well as in Kanzlei Berger on the same channel. Ernst lives with her daughter in Berlin.

Filmography
Film
2005: Reife Leistung (short film)
2009: Maata Meren Alla2009: Rabbit Without Ears 22013: Millionen2015: Schmidts Katze''

Television

References

External links

Annika Ernst at filmmakers.de
Annika Ernst at crew united
Agency profile at Fitz + Skoglund Agents

German film actresses
German stage actresses
German television actresses
1982 births
People from Schleswig, Schleswig-Holstein
Living people